Polesworth is a large village and civil parish in the North Warwickshire district of Warwickshire, England. Polesworth is situated close to the northern tip of Warwickshire, adjacent to the border with Staffordshire. The River Anker runs through the village, which joins the River Tame at nearby Tamworth Castle. 

In the 2021 census the civil parish of Polesworth had a population of 8,727, inclusive of the contiguous sub-villages (often regarded as suburbs) of Birchmoor, St Helena, and Hall End directly to the south, and Warton to the East. The built-up area of Polesworth which includes the adjoining village of Dordon to the south (a separate parish) had a population of 9,913 in 2021.

History

The name Polesworth is derived from "pol" meaning a "pool" and "worth" meaning "a dwelling" or enclosure in the Old English language. Polesworth was once the site of an abbey. Polesworth Abbey was founded in 827 by King Egbert with his daughter Editha (later Saint Editha) as Abbess. It prospered for 700 years but was disbanded as part of the Dissolution of the Monasteries. In 1544 the lands of the Abbey were granted by the Crown to Francis Goodere, who used the stones of the Abbey to build a manor house; Polesworth Hall. 

Henry Goodere, son of Francis, was a patron of the arts and Polesworth Hall was a centre of culture during Elizabethan times. The poet Michael Drayton was in the service of the Goodere family around 1580, and his works contain allusions to Polesworth and the River Anker. Other notable figures including the dramatist Ben Jonson, architect Inigo Jones and poet John Donne, made up the core of an elite group who became known as the Polesworth Circle. It is also rumoured that William Shakespeare spent time at Polesworth. Polesworth Hall no longer exists, as it was demolished around 1870, and replaced by the vicarage. 

In around 1509 Thomas Cockayne constructed Pooley Hall, which today includes some of the oldest brickwork in the country. The hall still exists and overlooks Pooley View. That part of the hall known as Pooley Farm was once the home of the late American Soul and Motown singer Edwin Starr, famous for the song War. 

During the English Civil War, Polesworth and Wilnecote are listed among the towns paying arrears to the Parliamentary garrison at Tamworth. In an account drawn up by a Captain Thomas Layfield for the period from 1 November 1645 to 1 May 1646, Polesworth (being rated at £8 a week) was assessed at and paid £196.16.0 while Wilnecote (at £2 a week) paid £50.7.0.

When the Coventry Canal was built through Polesworth in the 1770s, the village developed a coal-mining and clay industry and the population underwent rapid growth. During the Second World War, opencast coal-mining devastated the surrounding countryside, and caused the River Anker to be diverted. Mining in the area has since disappeared. 62.5 hectares of the site of the former Pooley Hall Colliery which closed in 1965 has been transformed into Pooley Country Park. Polesworth now serves mainly as a small commuter town for nearby towns and cities such as Tamworth, Atherstone, Lichfield, Sutton Coldfield, Nuneaton, Birmingham and Coventry.

Prior to 1870, much of the surrounding areas was owned by the Chetwynd family. During the late 1860’s and 1870’s a complicated family arrangement arose. Whether this was through a break up of a large family estate to provide for the children or was a result of debt is unclear. This did however involve mortgages of £50,000, a considerable sum even in those times. As time went by, the assets were sold off.

Transport

The M42 motorway runs just to the west of Polesworth and the A5 road runs just to the south. The Trent Valley section of the West Coast Main Line runs just to the north of the village.  railway station is on this line, however since 2005 the station has received only a "Parliamentary service" of just one northbound train per day. This is due to the fact that only the northbound platform is accessible, as the footbridge to the southbound platform was removed during upgrade works to the West Coast Main Line, and was not replaced. The nearest fully operational railway stations are Tamworth and Atherstone, both within . The Coventry Canal also runs through Polesworth.

Polesworth is served hourly by Arriva Midlands North-operated bus route 65 between Tamworth and Nuneaton.

Education
The main primary school in Polesworth is the Nethersole Primary School. This school has existed since the mid-17th century (albeit at a different location) having been founded by a local benefactor Sir Francis Nethersole as a free school for the poor of Polesworth. The main secondary school serving the area is The Polesworth School, based at the adjacent village of Dordon.

Culture
The Polesworth Poets Trail is an attraction which highlights the famous poets who were once associated with the village. The trail consists of strategically placed poems at various locations around the local area.

Notable residents
 Meghan Beesley (born 1989) - Athlete
 Michael Drayton (1563– 1631) - Poet
 Henry Goodere (1534–1595) - Nobleman 
 Francis Nethersole (1587–1659) - Diplomat, politician
 Denis Alva Parsons (1934-2012) - Sculptor
 Saint Edith of Polesworth (10th century) - Abbess
 Edwin Starr (1942-2003) - Soul and Motown singer

References

Sources

Allen, Geoff Warwickshire Towns & Villages, Sigma Leisure (2000) 
Brink, Jean R.  1990.  Michael Drayton revisited.  Boston: Twayne.  
The Warwickshire Village Book (1988)

External links

 Polesworth Parish Council
 Polesworth Parish - Local Website
 Polesworth Abbey
 Polesworth International Language College 
 Photos of Polesworth and surrounding area on geograph
 British History Online on Polesworth
 Polesworth Poets Trail
 Polesworth Archives - Our Warwickshire 

 
Villages in Warwickshire
Civil parishes in Warwickshire
Borough of North Warwickshire